The Irving Kristol Award is the highest honor conferred by the American Enterprise Institute for Public Policy Research.

The award is given for "notable intellectual or practical contributions to improved public policy and social welfare" and named in honor of Irving Kristol. It replaced the Francis Boyer Award in 2003. The award was named for Kristol as a tribute to his influence on public issues and as an intellectual mentor to several generations of conservatives. According to Christopher DeMuth, "In our sixty years of labors, no one has had a more profound influence on the work of the American Enterprise Institute, or on American political discourse, than Irving Kristol. Combining philosophical depth with intense practicality and constant good cheer, [Kristol] has, as President Bush has put it, 'transformed political debate on every subject he approached, from economics to religion, from social welfare to foreign policy.'"

The Kristol Award is presented at AEI's Annual Dinner, a gala dinner in Washington, D.C., that is well-attended by conservative leaders and is a major event on the Washington social scene. President George W. Bush spoke at the first Kristol Award presentation in 2003. Bush's speech, only days before the commencement of the Iraq War, laid out his promise to launch military action even if the United Nations Security Council did not authorize it. Former vice president Dick Cheney and former Spanish prime minister Jose Maria Aznar have also presented the award.

Kristol Award recipients occasionally make news with their speeches. John Howard, who had a few months before been defeated in the Australian elections, criticized his successor as prime minister, Kevin Rudd, over industrial relations and the Iraq War.

All recipients are given a token of esteem engraved with a citation for their achievements.

List of recipients

External links
List of winners of the Irving Kristol Award
Irving Kristol Award at the AEI website

References 

American Enterprise Institute
American awards